The 1940–41 La Liga was the tenth season since its establishment. Atlético Aviación retained the title.

Format changes
Due to the expansion of the league to 14 teams for the next season, the two last qualified teams, instead of being directly relegated to Segunda División, faced the third and fourth qualified teams in a single-game play-off match.

Team locations

After an absence of one season due to the damages in their stadium, Oviedo came back to La Liga. Murcia made its debut this season.

With the arrival of the Francoism, in 1941 a law that forbid the use of foreign names like Athletic, Sporting or Racing was approved. However, the clubs recovered their Royal patronages and started to use again the term Real in their denominations.

League table

Results

Relegation play-offs
The match between Zaragoza and Castellón was played at Estadio Chamartín in Chamartín de la Rosa, while the one between Murcia and Deportivo La Coruña, in Campo de Fútbol de Vallecas, in Vallecas.

|}

Top scorers

External links
LFP website

1940 1941
1940–41 in Spanish football leagues
Spain